The Dicksonpokalen (Dickson Trophy) is an annual athletics award given to the winner of the 1500 metres at the DN Galan meeting in Stockholm, Sweden.

The award was created by James F. Dickson, a stable master or equerry for the royal court. Dickson had previously given an award for the best runner of the English mile as part of a public sports festival in Gothenburg as early as 1887. A Swede, H Lönnroth, was the first known winner of the award with a time of six minutes and two seconds, competing against one other man in heavy rain. No trophy was provided to Lönnroth given the lack of competition and slow performance. The first trophy proper was given in 1891 as part of the sports festival at the Svea Life Guards sports ground. Hans Haugom, a Norwegian, won the event and returned to win again the following year. Patrik Löfgren of Sweden won three years in a row from 1892 to 1894 and was awarded the trophy permanently as a result.

The current trophy traces its history to 1895 and is no longer permanently awarded to an athlete, but the athlete has their name engraved on the award instead. Taking on an international aspect, the competition was open to all runners from the Nordic countries. Since 1906, the winning athlete's club gains the right to host the following year's competition. The race remained among the foremost annual athletics events in the region until the early 1920s. With diminishing interest, the management of the competition was given to the Swedish Athletics Association, who awarded it to the winner of the men's 1500 m at the annual Swedish Athletics Championships.

In the post-war era, the Dickson Trophy returned to its roots as an international mile run event and Dutchman Willem Slijkhuis became the first non-Nordic winner in 1948. The trophy became tied to the annual DN Galan athletics meeting in Stockholm in 1967. The distance was changed from the mile to 1500 m in 1981. Since its residency at the DN Galan, numerous high-profile middle-distance athletes have won the title, including Olympic champions Kipchoge Keino, John Walker, Sebastian Coe, Steve Ovett, Saïd Aouita, Noureddine Morceli, Hicham El Guerrouj and Kenenisa Bekele.

A new era for the trophy began in 2010 with the first women's winner, Nancy Langat of Kenya. Since that year, the Dicksonpokalen has been awarded to women in even-numbered years and men in odd-numbered years.

Winners

See also
Dream Mile
Emsley Carr Mile
Wanamaker Mile

References

Swedish sports trophies and awards
Awards established in 1887
Sport of athletics awards
Mile races
Athletics in Sweden
1887 establishments in Sweden